P. M. W. Wijayasuriya was the 33rd Auditor General of Sri Lanka. He was appointed on 11 October 1971, succeeding D. R. Settinayake, and held the office until 2 May 1983. He was succeeded by W. Gamini Epa.

References

Auditors General of Sri Lanka